Wendy Owen (born 1954) is an English former international football defender and coach. She was a member of the England women's national football team in their first official match, a 3–2 win over Scotland in Greenock.

Club career
Owen was born into a sporting family and played representative netball for Wales, her father David's homeland, as well as football for England. Inspired by watching the 1966 FIFA World Cup Final on television, Owen took up football but was prevented from playing at school and frustrated by the Football Association (FA) ban on female use of its pitches.

In 1968 an "incensed" Owen had to leave the boys' team she had played on when they joined an FA affiliated league. She persuaded her father to form a girls' team in nearby Beaconsfield, who played various other local girls' teams with unregistered referees and on pitches which fell outside the FA's jurisdiction. Underwhelmed with the level of competition, Owen left to join a superior team in Thame near the end of season 1969–70.

International career
On occasions when England's manager John Adams felt Owen had over elaborated he would say: "Wendy, I didn't pick you to play football, you just have to stop the opposition playing, and give it to a white shirt."

During her international career, Owen was mindful of sexist media coverage of women's football. She was asked by photographers to pose applying eye shadow in the Wembley dressing rooms, even though she never used eye shadow.

Coaching career 
Owen founded a women's football team at Dartford Teacher Training College, when travelling to Thame Ladies became too difficult. In her role as player-manager, she led the side to the WFA Cup quarter final in 1976–77 where they lost 3–2 to Southampton.

In spring 1974 Owen was headhunted by Francisco Marcos, later the founder and commissioner of the United Soccer Leagues (USL), to run a female soccer camp at Hartwick College in the United States.

In January 1987 Owen began working at the University of Chester. As of 2012, she was employed as a senior lecturer in Sports Coaching and Pedagogy.

References

Bibliography

 
 
 

Sportspeople from Slough
English women's footballers
England women's international footballers
Living people
1954 births
Date of birth missing (living people)
English people of Welsh descent
Women's association football central defenders
Footballers from Berkshire